Eramet is a French  multinational mining and metallurgy company, listed on the Euronext Paris exchange under the symbol ERA.

The company was founded with the funding of the Rothschild family (although they were careful to avoid being listed as founders of the company) in 1880. With discretion, the family took full control of the company in 1890.

The company produces non-ferrous metals and derivatives, nickel alloys and superalloys, and high-performance special steels.

Through its subsidiary Société Le Nickel (SLN), the company has its historical roots in nickel mining, and for over 100 years has maintained a large mining operation in the French overseas territory of New Caledonia. It is also a major producer of manganese from mines in Gabon. The Aubert & Duval organization of Issoire France is owned by Eramet and forms part of its alloy division.

Eramet's chairman and CEO is Christel Bories and its headquarters is in Paris.

Activities 
Eramet is organised into three activities:
 ERAMET Manganese (48% of the group's turnover): Eramet's subsidiary Comilog extracts manganese in the Moanda mine in Gabon and then transforms it in its metallurgical and chemical factories located in China, in Europe and in the United States.
 ERAMET Alloys (32% of the group's turnover): Eramet elaborates special steels and superalloys as well as wrought pieces for the aeronautic and energy sectors.
 ERAMET Nickel (20% of the group's turnover): Eramet's subsidiary, Le Nickel-SLN extracts nickel in five mines in New Caledonia, mainly to produce stainless steel.

Global presence 
Eramet’s 47 sites are divided across the five continents as follows:
 22 in Europe, among which 13 in France
 13 in Asia
 7 in North America, one on Route 7 near Marietta, Ohio.  Around 2018-2019, local residents started complaining about a loud, mechanical grinding noise..."a sound that once heard, could not be unheard".  The sound was found to be coming from recently-installed particulate scrubbers at Eramet...designed to reduce pollution. Across the river, in Vienna, WV, local government considered suing Eramet for the stress that the constant noise was causing to people in their community.  In an article in The Marietta Times, a spokesperson from Eramet said that the plant was consulting auditory specialists to study the noise issue and try to solve the problem.  On social media, Eramet still says that they are committed to being a good neighbor. As 2023 begins, the noise continues...as loud as it was 4 years ago.  It is always worse during winter, after deciduous foliage is gone from the trees. 
 2 in Latin America
 4 in Africa

Corporate governance 
Christel Bories, Eramet’s CEO, is at the head of the Board of Directors, which comprises nineteen members appointed for four years.

The Executive Committee has eight members.

References

External links

 

Mining companies of France
Nickel mining companies
Companies of New Caledonia
Companies established in 1880
French companies established in 1880
Privatized companies of France
Companies listed on Euronext Paris